The 1920 U.S. Open was the 24th U.S. Open, held August 12–13 at the Inverness Club in Toledo, Ohio.

Isle of Jersey natives Harry Vardon and Ted Ray played in their first U.S. Open since their playoff loss to Francis Ouimet in 1913. The 50-year-old Vardon, the champion twenty years earlier in 1900, held a five-stroke lead with just five holes to play. He then proceeded to three-putt three holes in a row, then double-bogeyed the 17th after finding the water. He shot 42 (+6) on the second nine, giving him a 78 (+7) for the round and 296 total (+12), and finished in a tie for second, one stroke back. Ray also struggled in the final round, with four bogeys on the back nine. But he parred the 18th, giving him 295 total and a one-stroke victory over runners-up Vardon, Jock Hutchison, Leo Diegel, and Jack Burke Sr.

This Open marked the first appearance by Bobby Jones, Gene Sarazen, Tommy Armour, and Johnny Farrell. Between them, they won eight of the next twelve U.S. Opens. This Open returned to the two-day format, with the first two rounds played on the same day; the three-day schedule was permanently adopted for 1926 and the present four-day schedule was first used in 1965.

Julius Boros was also 43 when he won in 1963. Hale Irwin set the current record in 1990 at age 45.

This was the first of six major championships at Inverness, which later hosted the U.S. Open in 1931, 1957, and 1979. The PGA Championship was played at the course in 1986 and 1993.

Course layout

Source:

Past champions in the field 

Source:

Round summaries

First round
Thursday, August 12, 1920 (morning)

Source:

Second round
Thursday, August 12, 1920 (afternoon)

Source:

Third round
Friday, August 13, 1920 (morning)

Source:

Final round
Friday, August 13, 1920 (afternoon)

Source:
(a) denotes amateur

Scorecard
Final round

Cumulative tournament scores, relative to par
Source:

References

External links
USGA Championship Database
USOpen.com – 1920

U.S. Open (golf)
Golf in Ohio
Sports in Toledo, Ohio
Sports competitions in Ohio
U.S. Open
U.S. Open
U.S. Open
August 1920 sports events